HD 129456, also known by its Bayer designation c1 Centauri (c1 Cen), is a star in the constellation Centaurus.  c¹ Centauri is an orange K-type giant with an apparent magnitude of +4.06.  It is approximately 209 light years from Earth.

References

Centauri, c1
Centaurus (constellation)
129456
K-type giants
5485
072010
Durchmusterung objects